NGC 1986 (also known as ESO 56-SC134) is an open cluster which is located in the Mensa constellation which is part of the Large Magellanic Cloud. It was discovered by James Dunlop on September 27, 1826. It has an apparent magnitude of 11.31 and its size is 2.80 by 2.40 arc minutes.

References

Open clusters
56-SC134
1986
Mensa (constellation)
Large Magellanic Cloud
Astronomical objects discovered in 1826
Discoveries by James Dunlop